The women's 100 metres hurdles event at the 2002 World Junior Championships in Athletics was held in Kingston, Jamaica, at National Stadium on 19 and 20 July.

Medalists

Results

Final
19 July
Wind: +3.4 m/s

Heats
20 July

Heat 1
Wind: +0.4 m/s

Heat 2
Wind: +0.3 m/s

Heat 3
Wind: +0.1 m/s

Participation
According to an unofficial count, 24 athletes from 19 countries participated in the event.

References

100 metres hurdles
Sprint hurdles at the World Athletics U20 Championships